Lotte Sandberg (1 October 1956 – 11 April 2021) was a Norwegian art historian and journalist. Between 1988  and 1996, Sandberg was co-editor of the Nordic art magazine SIKSI (published by the Nordic Council of Ministers / Nordic Art Center). She was author of the special issue on Norwegian contemporary art (issue 4, 1994). In 1997, she was part of the editorial board of the Norwegian Art Yearbook. She was editor of Billedkunst from 1991 to 1995 and editor of Norsk kunstårbok in 1998 and 1999. A collection of her critics were issued in 2018, selected by Regine Stokstad.

Sandberg held an MS from the University of Bergen (1987) with the main thesis 'The Italian Transavantgarden - an analysis of the international breakthrough'. She also had a master's degree in urbanism from the Oslo School of Architecture and Design (AHO) from 2008.

Sandberg died on 11 April 2021, aged 64.

Selected works

References

Norwegian art historians
Norwegian women historians
Norwegian journalists
Norwegian women journalists
Norwegian women writers
Norwegian art critics
Women art critics
Aftenposten people
1956 births
2021 deaths
People from Bodø
Place of death missing